Brett Williams (born 19 March 1968) is an English former footballer who played for Hereford United, Nottingham Forest, Northampton Town, Oxford United, Stockport County and Stoke City.

Career
Williams started his career at Nottingham Forest having progressed through the youth ranks at the City Ground. He spent eight years at Forest as understudy to England international left-back Stuart Pearce and made 43 appearances in the league before being released in 1993 where he entered non-league football with Arnold Town. Due to an injury to Pearce, Williams played in the 1992 League Cup Final against Manchester United, Forest losing 1–0.

Whilst at Nottingham Forest, he had loan spells at Stockport County, Northampton Town, Hereford United, Oxford United and finally Stoke City for whom he made just two appearances.

Career statistics
Source:

A.  The "Other" column constitutes appearances and goals in the Football League Trophy.

References

External links
 

1968 births
Living people
English footballers
Association football defenders
Premier League players
Nottingham Forest F.C. players
Stockport County F.C. players
Northampton Town F.C. players
Hereford United F.C. players
Oxford United F.C. players
Stoke City F.C. players
Arnold Town F.C. players
Sportspeople from Dudley